Ultimate Christmas is a 1998 compilation of Christmas music by the Beach Boys released on Capitol Records.  It rounds up all of the tracks from 1964's The Beach Boys' Christmas Album in addition to a handful of unreleased tracks from the aborted Merry Christmas from the Beach Boys album in 1977, some of which were revised to be included on M.I.U. Album the following year.

As a collection of the Beach Boys' Christmas tunes, Ultimate Christmas manages to round up virtually every song the band recorded and released on the subject.  In 2004 Capitol took it out of print and replaced it with Christmas with the Beach Boys, essentially the same compilation with different cover art and one song ("Christmas Time Is Here Again") removed from the track list.

Track listing

References

1998 Christmas albums
1998 compilation albums
Christmas compilation albums
The Beach Boys compilation albums
Capitol Records compilation albums
Christmas albums by American artists
Rock Christmas albums